St Mary's is the Gaelic football club in the village of Rochfortbridge, Westmeath, Ireland. The club was founded as an amalgamation of Gibbonstown and Rochfortbridge Warriors in 1950. In total, St Mary's have won three Senior championships, with six final appearances. The original Gaelic Athletic Association club in the village - Rochfortbridge Warriors - date back much further and were very successful, winning 5 Senior championships and appearing in a further 6 finals.

St Mary's won the Westmeath Senior Football Championship in their first year of existence and also won in 1954 and 1962.

In 2003, St Mary's were relegated from the Senior ranks. They won the Intermediate championship at the first time of asking in 2004, but were relegated to Intermediate in 2006 and Junior in 2007, a very low point for the club. They won the Junior championship straight away in 2008, eventually progressing to the Leinster Junior Club Final, which they lost. They have retained Intermediate status since then, reaching the semi-final of the championship in 2011.

At underage, St Mary's has had moderate success. The U12s won a Div 2 league 2004 and Div 1 league 2010. At U14, there have been Div 3 championships (2005,2009), a Div 2 final in 2008, a Div 1 championship in 2011 and a Div 4 final appearance in 2014. At U16 there were Div 2 league titles (2007,2010), a Div 2 championship in 2008 and a Div 1 final appearance in 2011. At minor level there has been a Div 1 league title in 2007 and a Div 2 final appearance in 2014. St Mary's was also well represented on the successful Clann Braonain teams of 2007 (U16) and 2009 (minor).

Off the field, the club continues to improve. In 2007 floodlit astroturf was installed to add to the current facilities at the club's main grounds. The club also maintains Fr Delaney Park as a separate training ground. A gym was scheduled to be built in 2015.

St Mary's defeated Shandonagh in the Intermediate final in 2017 by 1.11 to 1.10 to move back into the senior tier.
St.Mary’s are currently in Intermediate level in 2023.They are planning on building two new floodlight pitches starting in March of 2023

Senior Honours in Westmeath
 Westmeath Senior Football Championship: (3) 1950, 1954, 1962 By Rochfortbridge Warriors: (5) 1915, 1917, 1923, 1925, 1928 
 Westmeath Intermediate Football Championship: 1978, 1995, 2004, 2017
 Westmeath Junior Football Championship: (1) 2008

Underage Honours in Westmeath
 Westmeath Minor Football Championship -Div 2: - 2016
 Westmeath Minor Football League: 2007 (D1)
 Westmeath Under-16 Football League: 2007 (D2), 2010 (D2)
 Westmeath Under-16 Football Championship: 2008 (D2)
 Westmeath Under-14 Football Championship: (D3) 2015
    Westmeath Under-13 Football Championship -Div 2 shield 2022

Gaelic games clubs in County Westmeath